Jack Elder may refer to:
 Jack Elder (politician) (born 1949), New Zealand former politician
 Jack Elder (umpire) (1885–1944), Australian rules football umpire
 Jack Elder (luger) (born 1941), American Olympic luger

See also
 John Elder (disambiguation)